BS 5950 is a withdrawn British Standard for the design, fabrication and erection of structural steelwork. It does not apply to bridges, which are covered by BS 5400. BS 5950 replaced BS 449, which used a permissible stress approach, and uses limit state design methods. It is written for use in the UK but can be used worldwide. It was superseded by BS EN 1993 on 30 March 2010 and withdrawn.

05950
Structural engineering standards

///.